Jerome A. Chazen (March 21, 1927 – February 6, 2022) was an American businessman who was the founder and chairman of Chazen Capital Partners. He was also one of four and last surviving founders of Liz Claiborne.

Early life and career
Chazen was born to a Jewish family, in New York City, New York where his mother Rose was a seamstress, and his father David worked in commercial heating. and received a bachelor's degree in economics in 1948 from the University of Wisconsin–Madison where he was a member of Zeta Beta Tau Fraternity and an MBA from Columbia Business School in 1950. He served in the Navy from 1945–46 and it was at UW-Madison where Chazen met his future wife, Simona, and Liz Claiborne co-founder Art Ortenberg.

Chazen's first job was as an analyst on Wall Street at Sutro Brothers before he transitioned to a career in fashion beginning with Rhea Midwest, an apparel manufacturer. In 1968, Chazen left his job at Winkelman's, where he was hired as a merchandising manager in 1960, for a job in fashion on the east coast.

In 1976, he co founded Liz Claiborne Inc with Liz Claiborne, her husband Art Ortenberg, and Leonard Boxer. Chazen was initially in charge of direct marketing operations. When Liz Claiborne retired from the company in 1989, Chazen was named Chairman of the company and also served as CEO. He was named chair emeritus upon his retirement in 1996. Chazen saw the company through a time that significantly changed what women wore to work.

Chazen wrote and published My Life at Liz Claiborne in 2012.

Philanthropy
In 1991, Chazen donated $10 million to found The Chazen Institute of International Business at Columbia Business School and the Chazen Museum, formerly the Elvehjem Museum of Art, at the University of Wisconsin-Madison to which he and his wife also made donations of works of art.

Chazen served on the boards of the Newport Jazz and Louis Armstrong House and was chair emeritus at the Museum of Arts and Design.

Personal life and death
He was married to Simona Chivian whom he met at the University of Wisconsin–Madison. They had three children, seven grandchildren and one great-grandson. He died at his home in Upper Nyack on February 6, 2022, aged 94.

References

1927 births
2022 deaths
20th-century American businesspeople
20th-century American Jews
20th-century American philanthropists
21st-century American businesspeople
21st-century American Jews
American company founders
American fashion businesspeople
Businesspeople from New York City
Columbia Business School alumni
Jewish American philanthropists
Military personnel from New York City
University of Wisconsin–Madison alumni
United States Navy personnel of World War II